Zack & Quack is a CGI-animated children's television series created by Gili Dolev and Yvette Kaplan. The series is produced by Zodiak Media. Set inside a pop-up book, the show follows the adventures of a 7-year-old boy Zack and his best friend, Quack. The series premiered on Nick Jr. and Milkshake! in the United Kingdom and Ireland on February 7, 2014. In the United States, it began airing on April 5, 2014. In February 2017, the show ended completely.

Series overview

Episodes

Season 1 (2014)

Season 2 (2014)

Season 3 (2016–17)

References

Lists of British animated television series episodes
Lists of South Korean animated television series episodes

pl:Zack i Kwak#Spis odcinków